is a passenger railway station located in the city of Kakogawa, Hyōgo Prefecture, Japan, operated by the West Japan Railway Company (JR West).

Lines

Station layout
The station consists of three elevated island platforms with the station building underneath. The station has a Midori no Madoguchi staffed ticket office.

Platforms

History
On 1 April 1913, Banshū Railway (now Kakogawa Line) opened its terminal named Kakogawachō, which was merged into Kakogawa Station later (the railway company's application was posted on the Official Gazette (Kanpō) on 14 May 1915, but the actual date of the merger is unknown). The Banshū Railway also opened the line later named the Takasago Line originating from Kakogawachō on 1 December 1913. The Takasago Line closed on December 1, 1984. With the privatization of the Japan National Railways (JNR) on 1 April 1987, the station came under the aegis of the West Japan Railway Company.

Station numbering was introduced to the Kobe Line platforms in March 2018 with Kakogawa being assigned station number JR-A79.

Passenger statistics
In fiscal 2019, the station was used by an average of 23,989 passengers daily

Surrounding area
 Japan National Route 2
 Hyogo Prefectural Kakogawa Higashi High School
 Hyogo Prefectural Kakogawa Nishi High School
 Kakogawa Municipal Kakogawa Junior High School

See also
List of railway stations in Japan

References

External links

 JR West Station Official Site

Railway stations in Japan opened in 1888
Sanyō Main Line
Railway stations in Hyōgo Prefecture
Kakogawa, Hyōgo